A virgin is a person who has not engaged in sexual intercourse.

Virgin may also refer to:

Places
 Virgin, Utah, a town in the United States
 Virgin Islands (disambiguation)
 Virgin Mountains, a range northeast of Lake Mead in the United States
 Virgin River, a tributary of the Colorado River in the U.S. states of Utah, Nevada, and Arizona
 Virgin forest, ancient woodland (UK) or old-growth forest (US)

People
Arthur Russell Virgin (1877-1968), American and Canadian financier, corporate director, and philanthropist
Craig Virgin (born 1955), American long-distance runner
Dee Virgin (born 1993), American football player
Eric Virgin (officer) (1876–1950), Swedish Air Force general
Eric Virgin (diplomat) (1920–2004), Swedish diplomat
Lilian Virgin (born 1939), Swedish politician
Nerene Virgin, Canadian journalist, actress and television host
Roy Virgin (born 1939), English cricketer

Film and literature
 Virgin (2003 film), an American film
 Virgin (2004 film), an Indonesian film
 Virginity (film), a 1937 Czech film
 Virgins (novel), a 1984 novel by Caryl Rivers
 The Virgin (film), a 1924 American silent drama film
 The Virgins (novel), a 2013 novel by Pamela Erens
 Virgins (Gabaldon novella), a 2013 Outlander novella by Diana Gabaldon
 The Virgin (novel), a 1985 novel by Bayo Adebowale

Music
 Virgin (band), a Polish rock band
 Virgin (Virgin album), a 2002 album by the Polish pop rock band Virgin
 The Virgins, an American rock band
 Virgin (After School album), a 2011 album by South Korean girl group After School
 Virgins (album), a 2013 album by musician Tim Hecker
 Virgin Records, a record company

Other uses
 Virgin Group, a British conglomerate organization founded by Sir Richard Branson

 Virgin Racing, a Formula 1 racing team
 Virgin (title), a posthumous honorific
 Virgin Mary, the mother of Jesus Christ
 Virgin queen bee
 A way to describe a non-alcoholic beverage
 A commercial grade of olive oil, sometimes also used to describe other cooking oils

See also
Virgin Trains (disambiguation)
 Virgo (disambiguation)